Zelina may refer to:

Sveti Ivan Zelina, a town in Croatia
NK Zelina, a football club
Zelina, a team in the Croatian First League (women's handball)
Zelina (Kalesija), a village in Bosnia and Herzegovina
Zelina Vega (born 1990), American wrestler
Zelina (river), a river in Croatia, tributary of the Lonja